Chris Duvall (born September 10, 1991) is an American former professional soccer player who played as a right-back.  He is currently an assistant coach for the St. Louis City SC 2 in MLS Next Pro.

Born in Duluth, Georgia, Duvall began his career with club side Concorde Fire before enrolling at Wake Forest University and playing college soccer for the Wake Forest Demon Deacons. He spent four seasons with Wake Forest before being drafted by the New York Red Bulls in the 2014 MLS SuperDraft. Duvall spent three seasons with the Red Bulls, helping his club win the Supporters' Shield in 2015. He was then traded to the Montreal Impact where he played for two seasons before being traded again to the Houston Dynamo in 2019. After playing four matches for the Dynamo, Duvall was released and signed with USL Championship club OKC Energy before signing with the Portland Timbers for the 2020 season.  He retired following the 2021 season with FC Cincinnati.

Playing career

Early career
Born in Duluth, Georgia, Duvall attended the Wesleyan School for high school, playing on the school soccer and cross country teams.  He played club soccer for the Concorde Fire, helping them win three state championships. Duvall played college soccer for Wake Forest University from 2010 to 2013. He was a four-year starter for the Demon Deacons, making 74 appearances, scoring 1 goal, and recording 11 assists in his collegiate career.  Duvall helped the Deacs reach the NCAA Tournament in his sophomore, junior, and senior seasons.

New York Red Bulls

On January 16, 2014 Duvall was selected with the 22nd pick by the New York Red Bulls in the 2014 MLS SuperDraft. He signed with New York on He made his Red Bulls debut on May 17, coming on as a halftime substitute for Kosuke Kimura in a 2–0 loss to Toronto FC. Duvall made his first professional start the next week on May 24 in a 2–1 loss against the Portland Timbers. He ended his rookie season with 19 appearances, 18 of them starts, and 1 assist in the MLS regular season, helping NYRB finish 2nd in the Eastern Conference.  Duvall did not appear in the playoffs as the Red Bulls reached the conference finals.  He also made 1 Open Cup appearance and 2 CONCACAF Champions League appearances during the season.

On June 28, 2015 Duvall scored his first goal as a professional helping the Red Bulls to a 3–1 Hudson River Derby victory over New York City FC. A few days later, on July 1, 2015 Duvall helped the Red Bulls to a victory in the U.S. Open Cup over another local rival New York Cosmos, drawing a penalty kick during the match which was converted by Sacha Kljestan in a 4–1 victory. However, Duvall suffered a harsh tackle in the waning moments of the match which resulted in a broken right leg, keeping him out of action for the rest of the season.  He ended the regular season with 15 appearances, 1 goal, and 1 assist, helping the Red Bulls win the Supporters' Shield.

Due to various injuries to New York's central defenders, Duvall was converted to center-back during the early part of the 2016 season and started the match at center-back in a 7–0 Hudson River Derby victory against New York City FC on May 21.  Duvall made 25 appearances and had 2 assists in the regular season as the Red Bulls finished 1st in the East, 3 points behind FC Dallas for the Supporters' Shield.  He started both of New York's playoff games as they lost to the Montreal Impact 3–2 over two legs.  Duvall also made 2 appearances in the 2016–17 CONCACAF Champions League group stage, helping the Red Bulls top their group.

Montreal Impact
On December 13, 2016, Duvall was traded along with GAM to the Montreal Impact in exchange for Johan Venegas after being selected second overall by Minnesota United FC in the 2016 MLS Expansion Draft. Duvall made his Impact debut on March 4, 2017, starting in a 1–0 loss to the San Jose Earthquakes. He scored his first goal for the Impact on July 1 in a 2–0 win over D.C. United.  Duvall ended the season with 27 appearances, 1 goal, and 2 assists in MLS play as the Impact finished 9th in the Eastern Conference, failing to qualify for the playoffs.  He also made 3 appearances in the Canadian Championship as Montreal reached the final, where they lost to their rivals Toronto FC 3–2 on aggregate.  On December 29, 2017, Duvall signed a contract extension with Montreal through the 2019 season with an option for 2020.

During the 2018 season, Duvall made 15 appearances and had 1 assist as Montreal finished 7th in the East, one spot out of the playoffs.  He saw limited minutes during the second half of the season after suffering a calf injury in July.

Houston Dynamo
On December 17, 2018, Duvall was traded to the Houston Dynamo in exchange for a third-round pick in the 2020 MLS SuperDraft. He made his Dynamo debut on June 11 in a 3–2 win over the Austin Bold in the U.S. Open Cup.  He would appear in his only MLS match with the Dynamo on June 29, a 2–1 defeat to the New England Revolution.  Duvall  struggled to get playing time and spent time with the Dynamo's USL Championship affiliate Rio Grande Valley FC throughout the season.

On August 6, 2019, Duvall was waived by Houston.

Oklahoma City Energy
On September 21, 2019, Duvall joined USL Championship side Oklahoma City Energy for the remainder of their season. He made his Energy debut on September 22 in a 0–0 draw with Sacramento Republic.

Portland Timbers
On February 25, 2020, Duvall signed a contract with Portland Timbers for the 2020 season. He made his Timbers debut on March 8, playing the full 90 minutes in a 1–0 win over Nashville SC.  Shortly after the Nashville game, the MLS season was paused due to the COVID-19 Pandemic.  Play resumed in July with the MLS is Back tournament, with group stage games counting as regular season matches.  Duvall played in all 3 group stage games and played in 3 of Portland's 4 knockout round games to help the Timbers win the tournament.  He helped the Timbers finish the shortened regular season 3rd in the Western Conference, appearing in 10 of a possible 23 games.  He did not appear in their playoff game.  Duvall's contract option was declined by Portland following their 2020 season.

FC Cincinnati
On August 20, 2021, after participating in training sessions with the club, Duvall signed with Major League Soccer club FC Cincinnati. He made his debut for the club the next day on August 21 against the New England Revolution, coming on as a substitute in a 4–1 defeat. Duvall made 4 appearances during the season as FCC finished last in the Eastern Conference and overall standings. Following the 2021 season, Cincinnati declined their contract option on Duvall.

On January 4, 2022, Duvall announced his retirement.

Coaching career 
Duvall joined the Charleston Battery as an assistant coach ahead of the 2022 USL Championship season. On January 23, 2023, it was announced that Duvall had joined Bobby Murphy's St. Louis City SC 2 staff as an assistant.

Career statistics

Honors
 New York Red Bulls
MLS Supporters' Shield : 2015

 Portland Timbers
MLS is Back Tournament: 2020

Personal life 
Chris Duvall was born in Duluth, Georgia to Derrell and Darlene Duvall. His brother, Cristan, was on the cross country and track and field teams at Georgia Tech. His godfather is former Pro-Bowl receiver Billy "White Shoes" Johnson.

References

External links 

wakeforestsports.com

1991 births
Living people
People from Duluth, Georgia
Sportspeople from the Atlanta metropolitan area
Soccer players from Georgia (U.S. state)
African-American soccer players
American soccer players
Association football defenders
Wake Forest Demon Deacons men's soccer players
New York Red Bulls draft picks
New York Red Bulls players
CF Montréal players
Houston Dynamo FC players
Rio Grande Valley FC Toros players
OKC Energy FC players
Portland Timbers players
FC Cincinnati players
Major League Soccer players
USL Championship players